Fernando de Jesus Benitez Gomez (born August 6, 1989) is a Mexican professional basketball player for the Indomables de Ciudad Juarez and the Mexico national basketball team.

He participated at the 2017 FIBA AmeriCup.

References

External links
 RealGM profile

1989 births
Living people
Mexican men's basketball players
Centers (basketball)
Capitanes de Ciudad de México players
Halcones Rojos Veracruz players
Mineros de Zacatecas (basketball) players
Ostioneros de Guaymas (basketball) players
Panteras de Aguascalientes players
Basketball players from Nayarit
Sportspeople from Tepic, Nayarit